Malboro may refer to:
 Malborough, a village in the south of England
 a misspelling of Marlboro
 a monster in the Final Fantasy game series and spin-offs